John Rødseth (born 11 July 1947) is a Norwegian sport shooter. He was born in Kongsberg. He competed at the 1968 Summer Olympics in Mexico City, at the 1972 Summer Olympics in Munich and at the 1976 Summer Olympics in Montreal.

References

1947 births
Living people
People from Kongsberg
Norwegian male sport shooters
Olympic shooters of Norway
Shooters at the 1968 Summer Olympics
Shooters at the 1972 Summer Olympics
Shooters at the 1976 Summer Olympics
Sportspeople from Viken (county)
20th-century Norwegian people